Feels So Right is the fifth studio album by American country music band Alabama, released in February 1981 by RCA Nashville. It was their first #1 on the Billboard Top Country Albums chart. On the all-genre Billboard 200 the album peaked at #16 and stayed for more than three years, longer than any other Alabama album.

Feels So Right produced three Number One hits on the Billboard Hot Country Singles chart: "Old Flame", the title track and "Love in the First Degree". The latter two also reached the Top 20 of the Billboard Hot 100. The album was certified quadruple platinum by the Recording Industry Association of America.

Track listing

Notes
 "Burn Georgia Burn" is listed as "Burn Georgia Down" on the CD release.

Personnel

Alabama
Randy Owen - lead vocals, rhythm guitar
Teddy Gentry - vocals, bass guitar, lead vocals on "Burn Georgia Burn"
Jeff Cook - vocals, lead guitar, lead vocals on "See the Embers, Feel the Flame"
Mark Herndon - drums

Other musicians
Rick Scott - drums
Arliss Scott - guitars
Jack Eubanks - guitars
David Humphreys - drums
Leo Jackson - guitar
Fred Newell - guitar
Willie Rainsford - keyboards 
Billy Reynolds - guitar
David Smith - bass guitar
Strings arranged by Kristin Wilkinson

Production
Produced by Alabama, Harold Shedd and Larry McBride
Engineers: Jim Cotton, Gene Rice, Harold Shedd
Assistant engineers: Paul Goldberg, Ben Hall, Joe Mills
Mastering: Randy Kling

Chart performance

Album

Singles

Certifications

References

1981 albums
RCA Records albums
Alabama (American band) albums
Albums produced by Harold Shedd